Alto Pencoso is a village and municipality in San Luis Province in central Argentina.

References

Municipios de San Luis 

Populated places in San Luis Province